Koyanovo (Quyan) is a rural locality (a selo) in Starobazanovsky Selsoviet, Birsky District, Bashkortostan, Russia. The population was 130 as of 2010. There are 5 streets.

Geography 
Koyanovo is located 29 km southwest of Birsk (the district's administrative centre) by road. Usakovo is the nearest rural locality.

References 

Rural localities in Birsky District